Man Is the Bastard was an American hardcore punk band based in Claremont, California. The band existed from 1990 to 1997, releasing mostly vinyl splits, extended plays, and albums on obscure labels from around the world. By 1997, the group ended and members all went on to do other projects, such as the noise group Bastard Noise, which originally started out as a Man Is the Bastard side project. They are typically seen as part of the 1990s powerviolence movement.

Man Is the Bastard has dissolved but its members are involved with a number of other projects. Wood occasionally performs in the Los Angeles area as Bastard Noise. Kenyon and Connel continue to perform in progressive rock acts such as Frank Booth Youth, Bastard Lounge, ControllingHand, Lux Nova Umbra Est, and Umbra Vita. Andy Beattie continues doing vocals. Staying within his hardcore/powerviolence roots, he has performed/screamed in such bands as Controlling Hand, Low Threat Profile, Infest, Dead Language, featuring members from Iron Lung, and Cave State. His current band, Dead Mans Life (2018) performs the Los Angeles area. His "solo" band, Institute of Infinite Sorrow, is active.

Style

Musical
Man Is the Bastard (aka Charred Remains) has been described as powerviolence (a term that was created by Matt Domino, a member of Eric Wood's previous band Neanderthal), hardcore punk, noise rock, and sludge metal. The band's "set up" included two bass guitars, as well as dual vocals, performed by Wood and Kenyon. The band is also notable for their extensive use of noise, even going as far as creating the noise side-project Bastard Noise, which still actively make releases to this day. This heavy noise influence was brought into the band's sound in part by band member Henry Barnes, who brought his electronics into the band's sound. Barnes made his own electronic instruments from scratch. Man Is the Bastard's recordings are characterized by their thin, raw low fidelity production values.

Lyrical
The band's lyrics are often political and dark, with common themes being animal rights, violence, misanthropy, torture, police brutality, starvation, and depression. Man Is the Bastard's lyrical violence was balanced by their adamant advocacy of progressive ideals. This record of political activism resulted in their most widely available album, 1997’s split LP with death row prisoner Mumia Abu-Jamal.

Artwork
Artistically most of their releases had a similar design, with their trademark skull on both sides of the words Man Is The Bastard with the release title underneath in quotations. The band's "skull logo" was originally taken from a medical book that Eric Wood was reading. Most of their recordings included simplistic liner notes that briefly explained each track's meanings. When artwork was used, it was typically stark, standing out against a basic layout. In 2012 the band Akron/Family used the skull logo for a t-shirt design, to which Eric Wood accused of plagiarism. The band apologized, and both parties made up in agreement.

Influence
The band is now seen as a critical part of the California powerviolence movement. Spazz bassist and operator of Slap-a-Ham Records Chris Dodge has called the group "the most unique band of their day". The indie folk band AJJ reference the group on the track "Do Re and Me" on their 2014 album Christmas Island.

Members

Original line-up
Eric Wood - vocals, bass
Joel Connell - drums
Henry Barnes - guitars, electronics
Aaron Kenyon - vocals, bass
Shawn Connell - guitar on Charred Remains / Pink Turds in Space Split EP.

Later members
Bill Nelson - electronics
Andrew Beattie - vocals
Isreal Lawrence - vocals, electronics

Discography

Studio albums

Extended plays

Split records

Compilation albums

Compilation appearances

References

External links
Man Is The Bastard - BandToBand.com
Discogs page

Hardcore punk groups from California
Musical groups established in 1991
Musical groups disestablished in 1997
American industrial music groups
Powerviolence groups
1991 establishments in California
American crust and d-beat groups